The Palinkopf (also spelled Paliner Kopf) (2,864 m) is a mountain of the Samnaun Alps, located on the border between Switzerland and Austria. It lies west of Samnaun and is part of the Samnaun-Ischgl ski area.

References

External links
 Palinkopf on Hikr
 Palinkopf on Summitpost

Mountains of the Alps
Mountains of Switzerland
Mountains of Tyrol (state)
Austria–Switzerland border
International mountains of Europe
Mountains of Graubünden